Robert McCool (11 August 1942 in Edinburgh – 22 March 2019) was a Scottish footballer who played  for Third Lanark, Cheltenham Town and Gloucester City.

Playing career 
McCool started as a junior at Rangers before joining Third Lanark in February 1960 from Ormiston Primrose.  McCool made his debut for Third Lanark aged just 17 but a badly injured ankle resulted in him only making three first team appearances for the club. A spell in Canada with Hamilton Steelers was brief as he was homesick and returned to the UK.  He turned down Dunfermline Athletic and Hastings United to sign for Cheltenham Town in 1962. McCool scored 30 goals in toal for Cheltenham Town.
In 1965, McCool left Cheltenham Town and joined neighbours Gloucester City where he stayed until 1975, being voted player of the year twice in 1966/67 and 1967/68.

After leaving Gloucester City he briefly turned out for Bishops Cleeve.

McCool died on 22 March 2019.

References

Footballers from Edinburgh
Scottish footballers
Ormiston Primrose F.C. players
Third Lanark A.C. players
Hamilton Steelers (ECPSL) players
Cheltenham Town F.C. players
Gloucester City A.F.C. players
Bishop's Cleeve F.C. players
Scottish Football League players
1942 births
2019 deaths
Association football wingers
Scottish expatriate sportspeople in Canada
Expatriate soccer players in Canada
Scottish expatriate footballers